Fernando Cedrola de Souza (born December 27, 1986) is a Brazilian footballer currently playing for Club Aurora who signed him as a free transfer in 2011.

He previously played for clubs including Benevento.

References

1986 births
Living people
Brazilian footballers
Brazilian expatriate footballers
C.D. Nacional players
Club Aurora players
Esporte Clube Juventude players
Expatriate footballers in Bolivia
Expatriate footballers in Italy
Expatriate footballers in Portugal
Association football defenders